The Bielefelder Kennhuhn or Bielefelder is a German breed of domestic chicken. It was developed in the area of Bielefeld in the 1970s by Gerd Roth, who cross-bred birds of Malines and Welsumer stock with American Barred Rocks to create the breed. Like other breeds with Barred Rock parentage, it is auto-sexing – chicks of different sexes can be distinguished by their colour. There is a bantam version, the Bielefelder Zwerg-Kennhuhn.

History 

The concept of an auto-sexing chicken breed goes back to the work of Reginald Punnett in the 1930s.

The Bielefelder Kennhuhn was developed in the 1970s in the area of Bielefeld, in Ostwestfalen-Lippe in the state of Nordrhein-Westfalen. It was created by Gerd Roth by cross-breeding of birds of Malines and Welsumer stock with American Barred Rock birds.

In 2007 its conservation status, as reported to the DAD-IS database of the FAO, was "not at risk". It is not among the endangered chicken breeds listed by the Gesellschaft zur Erhaltung alter und gefährdeter Haustierrassen.

Characteristics 

The Bielefelder was initially bred in one colour only, crele (German ) – the cuckoo pattern with black-breasted red colouring. A silver variety (German ) was later created; it shows the same patterning as in the crele variety, but without any red or yellow colouration. It is a new colour, not seen in any other breed.

Like other breeds with Barred Rock parentage, the Bielefelder is an auto-sexing breed – chicks of different sexes can be distinguished by their colour.

Use 

The Bielefelder is dual-purpose breed, well suited to extensive management. It is fast-growing and yields a good carcass. Hens may give about 230 large brown eggs per year, with an average weight of about 

Bantam hens may give about 160 eggs per year, with an average weight of

References 

Chicken breeds
Chicken breeds originating in Germany